The 1979 Gent–Wevelgem was the 41st edition of the Gent–Wevelgem cycle race and was held on 4 April 1979. The race started in Ghent and finished in Wevelgem. The race was won by Francesco Moser of the Sanson team.

General classification

References

Gent–Wevelgem
1979 in road cycling
1979 in Belgian sport
April 1979 sports events in Europe
1979 Super Prestige Pernod